is a passenger railway station in located in the city of Owase, Mie Prefecture, Japan, operated by Central Japan Railway Company (JR Tōkai).

Lines

Station layout
The station consists of two opposed side platforms connected to the station building by a footbridge. The small station building dates from the original construction of the line. The station is unattended.  At present, the station operates as a single side platform for bidirectional traffic, with the overpass closed off and Platform 2 out of service.

Platforms

History 
Mikisato Station opened on 23 April 1958 as a station on the Japan National Railways (JNR) Kisei Main Line.  The station has been unattended since 21 December 1983. The station was absorbed into the JR Central network upon the privatization of the JNR on 1 April 1987. On 10 April 2005 use of Platform 2 was discontinued.

Passenger statistics
In fiscal 2019, the station was used by an average of 48 passengers daily (boarding passengers only).

Surrounding area
Honen-ji Buddhist temple

See also
List of railway stations in Japan

References

External links

  JR Central timetable 

Railway stations in Japan opened in 1958
Railway stations in Mie Prefecture
Owase, Mie